The 1993 AFL Grand Final was an Australian rules football game contested between the  Carlton Football Club and Essendon Football Club, held at the Melbourne Cricket Ground in Melbourne on 25 September 1993. It was the 97th annual grand final of the Australian Football League (formerly the Victorian Football League), staged to determine the premiers for the 1993 AFL season. The match, attended by 96,862 spectators, was won by Essendon by a margin of 44 points, marking that club's 15th premiership victory.

Background

Neither side was considered a strong premiership prospect at the beginning of the season, as neither side had made the finals in 1992. Essendon was considered too young and inexperienced, while Carlton, despite having some of the best key-position players in the competition, were considered too slow across the ground.

However, at the conclusion of the home and away season, Essendon had finished first on the AFL ladder with 13 wins 6 losses and a draw, winning the McClelland Trophy after having been sitting in seventh position as late as round 15. Carlton had also finished with 13 wins, 6 losses and a draw (the two teams having played in a tied game in round 2), but finished just behind Essendon on percentage. Only a game and a half separated Essendon in first position from Geelong in seventh position.

In the finals, the Bombers were defeated by Carlton by two points in the Qualifying final before defeating West Coast in the second semi-final to advance to the preliminary final. In this game they came out of nowhere to win a game that had seemed out of reach when trailing the Adelaide Crows by 42 points at half time. The Bombers charged home in the second half in that game, kicking 11 goals to 2 to win by 11 points, advancing to the grand final. Carlton, after their win over the Bombers in the qualifying final, defeated Adelaide in the second semi-final to advance to the grand final.

This was Essendon's first appearance in a grand final since losing the 1990 AFL Grand Final, whilst it was Carlton's first since winning the 1987 VFL Grand Final, and it was their first clash in a VFL/AFL Grand final since 1968.

In the week leading up to the Grand final, Essendon's Gavin Wanganeen was awarded the Brownlow Medal. Also during that week, Essendon caused a sensation in omitting Derek Kickett from the team. Kickett had played every game of the season up to that point but had lost form during the finals series.

Carlton entered the grand final as warm favourites, even though Essendon finished on top with a percentage margin of 1.5 against the Blues. The Bombers played more a younger side compared to them.

Carlton were forced to make a late change when veteran defender Peter Dean was ruled out through injury. Essendon coach Kevin Sheedy put Dean Wallis and Mark Harvey into the side at the expense of Kickett and David Flood. The Bombers played a second generation of 'Baby Bombers' for the grand final, with seven Essendon players—Gavin Wanganeen, David Calthorpe, Dustin Fletcher, Rick Olarenshaw, Mark Mercuri, James Hird and Joe Misiti—all being under the age of 21.

As 1993 was proclaimed by the United Nations as the International Year of the World's Indigenous People, the Grand Final pre-match entertainment featured some prominent Australian indigenous musicians: Gunditjmara/Bundjalung singer/songwriter Archie Roach, Turrbal mezzo-soprano Maroochy Barambah and Northern Territory–based band Yothu Yindi, whose indigenous members were of the Yolngu tribe. Barambah performed "Waltzing Matilda" and the national anthem. She was widely panned for her performance, falling behind and dropping almost an entire verse out of sequence with the orchestral track.

Match summary

Essendon carried their form from the preliminary final into the grand final against the Blues, with the individual brilliance of Michael Long being the most memorable feature. The Norm Smith Medal was awarded to Long for being judged the best player afield, with 33 disposals and 2 goals.

Stephen Kernahan tried hard for the Blues with 7 goals, but his side barely threatened after being down by 5 goals at the first change. Essendon had thirteen scoring shots to three by the Blues in the first quarter to set up their win. Paul Salmon kicked 5 goals for the Bombers.

Teams

Scorecard

Media coverage 
The 1993 AFL Grand Final has the ignominious honour of being the lowest TV ratings of any AFL grand final since TV records have been kept.

References

Bibliography

External links

See also
 1993 AFL season

VFL/AFL Grand Finals
1993 Australian Football League season
Afl Grand Final, 1993
Essendon Football Club
Carlton Football Club